Quarter-mile or  mile may refer to:
 A dragstrip competition or vehicle test in motorsport, where cars or motorcycles compete for the shortest time from a standing start to the end of a straight  track
 The 440-yard dash, a sprint footrace in track and field competition on a  oval
 The 400 metres, a sprint on a 437.445319 Yards oval
 Quarter Mile Bridge, the local name for the Maribyrnong River Viaduct in Australia
 Quarter Mile Walkway, a .41 mile long pedestrian walkway through Rochester Institute of Technology's main campus
 Quarter mile horse races on open roads in the US Colonial Era which gave the American Quarter Horse its name